John Sydney Buller  (23 August 1909 – 7 August 1970) was an English first-class cricketer and international umpire. He was a wicket-keeper.

Playing career

Buller was born in Wortley near Leeds in Yorkshire. As a player, he was a competent wicket-keeper and lower-order right-hand bat. He played for Worcestershire between 1935 and 1946, having played once for Yorkshire in 1930. In 1939, he was severely injured in the car crash that killed Worcestershire opening batsman Charlie Bull, on the Sunday evening of the Whitsun match with Essex, and missed the next two months of cricket.

Umpire

He made his debut as a first-class umpire in 1951. He umpired in 33 Tests between 1956 and 1969. He was awarded the MBE in 1965. In August 1970, Buller collapsed and died at Edgbaston, Birmingham, during a break for rain, when officiating in a match between Warwickshire and Nottinghamshire.

A fearless umpire, he repeatedly called Geoff Griffin for throwing in the exhibition match staged following the early conclusion of the Lord's Test between England and South Africa in 1960, after Frank Lee had called him during the Test itself. This had the effect of ending Griffin's Test career.

References

1909 births
1970 deaths
People from Wortley, Leeds
English cricketers
Yorkshire cricketers
Worcestershire cricketers
Royal Air Force cricketers
English Test cricket umpires
Members of the Order of the British Empire
Wicket-keepers